Kopriva is a small settlement in the Municipality of Razkrižje in eastern Slovenia, next to the border with Croatia. The area traditionally belonged to the Styria region and is now included in the Mura Statistical Region.

References

External links
Kopriva on Geopedia

Populated places in the Municipality of Razkrižje